The Mystery of the Yellow Room (French: Le mystère de la chambre jaune) is a 1949 French mystery film directed by Henri Aisner and starring Hélène Perdrière, Serge Reggiani and Pierre Renoir. It is an adaptation of the 1907 novel The Mystery of the Yellow Room by Gaston Leroux. The film's sets were designed by the art director Max Douy. It was followed by a sequel The Perfume of the Lady in Black, released the same year.

There were other film adaptations of the novel, in 1919, 1930, and 2003.

Plot
A young reporter solves a mystery crime. The fictional reporter is Joseph Rouletabille. He works on a complex, and seemingly impossible, crime in which the criminal appears to disappear from a locked room.

Cast
 Hélène Perdrière as Mathilde Stangerson 
 Serge Reggiani as Joseph Rouletabille 
 Pierre Renoir as Professeur Stangerson 
 Léonce Corne as Marquet 
 Janine Darcey as Sylvie 
 Arthur Devère as Père Jacques 
 Marcel Herrand as Larsan 
 Robert Le Fort as Le secrétaire 
 Fabien Loris as Julien 
 Germaine Michel as La cuisinière 
 Gaston Modot as Arthur 
 Lucien Nat as Robert Darzac 
 Madeleine Barbulée as La femme de chambre

See also
 Whodunit

References

External links

1949 films
French mystery films
1940s French-language films
Films based on French novels
Films based on works by Gaston Leroux
1949 mystery films
Remakes of French films
French black-and-white films
1940s French films